The peyote stitch, also known as the gourd stitch, is an off-loom bead weaving technique.  Peyote stitch may be worked with either an even or an odd number of beads per row.  Both even and odd count peyote pieces can be woven as flat strips, in a flat round shape, or as a tube.  Tubular peyote is used to make pouches or to decorate objects such as bottles or fan handles.

Many cultures around the world have used peyote stitch in their beadwork.  Examples of peyote stitch have been found in artifacts from Ancient Egypt, and the stitch has also been used in historic and contemporary Native American beadwork.  The name "peyote stitch" derives from the use of this stitch to decorate objects used in peyote ceremonies by members of the Native American Church.  The name "gourd stitch" similarly derives from the use of the stitch in decorating gourd containers.

Variations on Peyote stitch

A variation of the peyote stitch is often referred to as the fast peyote stitch as its use resembles peyote, but it can be done in less time.

Much like the first two rows of a peyote stitch project, the speed stitch requires two rows be strung then worked in. It can only be done with an even number of beads but is easily done in either flat or tubular peyote.

Peyote Stitch can be done in the round, on the diagonal, flat or tubular. A versatile stitch which is a favourite of many beaders.

A new form of peyote stitch has been created by Gerlinde Linz. This is called Peyote with a twist, not bead crochet. Often abbreviated to PWAT, although Linz prefers Peytwist. This form of diagonal peyote, when worked up into a chain can form the look of a crochet rope.

The Cellini spiral was originated by seed bead masters Virginia Blakelock and Carol Perenoud who developed the tubular variation and named it after Benvenuto Cellini, a 16th-century Italian sculptor known for his Rococo architectural columns. Eventually, the flat version emerged, and both techniques are equally beautiful.

History 
The peyote stitch can be found dating back to Ancient Egypt. Most notably, the tomb of King Tutankhamun contains many artifacts utilizing the stitch. The Egyptians created broad collars with the stitch with molded tubular beads. These collars are depicted on gods, kings, and others.

Not only has the stitch been found in Ancient Egypt, but Native Americans have also been using it for centuries. Native American beadwork began using glass beads when the Europeans brought over glass beads. The peyote stitch got its modern name from the Kiowa and Comanche Tribes in the 1800s. Modern Native American beadwork uses the peyote stitch in jewelry, objects, and traditional objects.

See also 
 Brick stitch
 Square stitch

References

External links
 BeadJewelryMaking:  Peyote Stitch Instruction: even count flat, odd count flat and Tubular peyote stitch
 Bead Wrangler - Preserving Beadwork History for the new Millennium:  Peyote Samples No longer a functioning site.
 Fire Mountain Gems video tutorial
 Beadage Glossary: Peyote Stitch

Native American Church
Indigenous beadwork of the Americas